ISSDC may refer to:

 International Shiloh Shepherd Dog Club, an organization.
 International Space Settlement Design Competition, a previously NASA sponsored competition and ongoing program.